Lalitham Sundaram is a Malayalam-language comedy-drama film directed by Madhu Warrier in his directorial debut. The film stars Biju Menon, Manju Warrier, Saiju Kurup, Deepti Sati and Anu Mohan. Manju  Warrier co-produced the film with Kochumon under the banner Manju Warrier Productions.

Synopsis
Sunny, Annie, and their younger brother Jerry are disconnected from their family due to their busy schedule. The siblings reunite for their mother's death anniversary and decide to fulfill her last wish. This reunion leads to a series of hilarious incidents that eventually help them repair their dysfunctional familial bonds.

Cast 
Biju Menon as Sunny Mary Das
Manju Warrier as Annie Mary Das
Anu Mohan as Jerry Mary Das  Kunjan
Raghunath Paleri as Das
Saiju Kurup as Sandeep, Annie's husband
Deepti Sati as Simy, Jerry's girlfriend
Sudheesh as Rajesh, Sunny's friend
Remya Nambeesan as Sophia, Sunny's wife
Zarina Wahab as Mary Das
Madhu Warrier as Doctor
Nandhu as Music Director Harikumar
Vinod Thomas as Xavier
Anjana Appukuttan as Lisy
Thennal Abhilash as Rukmini  Rukku, Annie's daughter
Ashwin Warrier as Paul, Annie's son
Ambika Mohan as Sister Maria
Asha Aravind as Priya

Production

Pre-production
The film was announced by Mammootty and Mohanlal in their respective social media accounts in January 2020. The puja of the film was on February 18, 2020.

P Sukumar does the cinematography for the film along with Gautham Sankar  and Lijo Paul handles the editing. Bineesh Chandran is the Art director of the movie and Sakhi Elsa is the costume designer. The National Film Award winning, choreographer, Kala Master is the dance choreographer of the movie.

Filming
The principal photography of the film began in February 2020 at Peermade and Vandiperiyar The film was planned to be shot on a single schedule, but the shooting came to a sudden hault due to the COVID-19 Pandemic in March, 2020. The crew had completed about half of the shooting before the lockdown. After about nine month's lockdown, the shooting was resumed in December 2020.  As there was a long gap between the two schedules the director says that all the actors had to begin from the scratch again. The second schedule was shot in Peermade and Ernakulam. The filming was wrapped up in January 2021.

Music 
bijibal is the music director for this film and, B.K.Harinarayanan is the lyricist.

Release 
Lalitham Sundaram was released on 18 March 2022. The film was initially planned to be released in July 2020, but was postponed due to the COVID-19 pandemic. Then, It was slated for multiple times including for April 2021, August 2021, September 2021, January 2022, but they failed to release it, due to ongoing COVID-19 pandemic. On 26 February 2022, It was announced that the film would be skipping its theatrical release and takes to direct-to-digital release on Disney+ Hotstar.

References

External links 

Indian comedy-drama films
Films shot in Kochi
Films shot in Munnar
2022 films
2020s Malayalam-language films
Film productions suspended due to the COVID-19 pandemic
Films postponed due to the COVID-19 pandemic